The PWS-33 Wyżeł was a Polish twin-engined military trainer aircraft from a period before World War II constructed by Podlaska Wytwórnia Samolotów or PWS ("Podlasie Aircraft Factory"). Although destined for production it got no further than the prototypes before Poland was invaded.

Design and development

With an expected advent of a twin-engine heavy fighter, the PZL.38 Wilk, which was supposed to be a basic fighter and bomber aircraft in the Polish Air Force, there appeared the need for a twin-engine trainer aircraft for pilots. In 1936, the PWS works were ordered to build a trainer of cheap wooden construction, similar in layout to the PZL.38. The main designer was Wacław Czerwiński, known for designing several successful sailplanes.

The prototype of the PWS-33 first flew in August–September 1938. The aircraft appeared successful with good flight characteristics and the maximum speed turned out to be even higher than had been estimated. It was given a name Wyżeł (Polish: "pointer"). The prototype was soon shown at the Paris Air Show, in November–December 1938 (under the name PZL Wyżeł) and met with an interest in the world press. In January 1939 the second prototype PWS-33/II flew. It was also capable of aerobatics. The plane was quite light and small and comparable to the single-engine trainer PWS-26.

After trials, the plane was ordered into production. In the meantime, the PZL.38 Wilk program was appearing unsuccessful due to lack of proper engines and was canceled. However the PWS-33 could still find a place as a trainer for pilots of PZL.37 Łoś medium bombers, which were also similar in appearance to the PWS-33, and for future heavy fighters such as the PZL.48 Lampart. In summer 1939 production of the first series of 25 aircraft started but they were not completed due to the outbreak of war.

Operational history
After the German invasion of Poland,  the first prototype was bombed in the PWS factory in Biała Podlaska in September 1939. The second damaged prototype was captured by the Germans at Warsaw-Okęcie airfield; its further fate is uncertain.

Operators

Polish Air Force

Description
It was a twin-engine low-wing monoplane of wooden construction with a plywood outer skin. The fuselage was semi-monocoque, elliptic in cross-section. The enclosed cabin seated the student at the front with the instructor behind under a common canopy with rearwards sliding sections. Dual controls were fitted. Two-spar wings, with slats and flaps. Twin vertical stabilizers. Engines in underwing nacelles, duralumin covered. Retractable landing gear, with main wheels half-hidden in engine nacelles, enabling safe emergency landing, and a rear skid.

Specification

See also

References

Chwałczyk T., Glass Andrezej: ”Samoloty PWS”(Aircraft of the PWS), Wydawnictwo Komunikacji i Łączności. Warszawa 1990.
Andrzej Glass: "Polskie konstrukcje lotnicze 1893-1939" (Polish Aviation Constructions 1893-1939), WKiŁ, Warsaw 1977 (Polish language, no ISBN)
Andrzej Glass: "PWS 33 Wyzel", Wydawnictwo MILITARIA, Warsaw, 1995,

External links

Photos and drawings at Ugolok Neba

1930s Polish military trainer aircraft
PWS aircraft